The Sulphur Times-Democrat is a weekly newspaper based in Sulphur, Oklahoma. It has been published from 1927–present. The newspaper is currently owned and edited by James John.

The newspaper circulates in the Murray County area, which includes Sulphur and Davis, Oklahoma.

References 

Newspapers published in Oklahoma